is a Japanese table tennis player. He competed at the 1988 Summer Olympics and the 1992 Summer Olympics.

References

1961 births
Living people
Japanese male table tennis players
Olympic table tennis players of Japan
Table tennis players at the 1988 Summer Olympics
Table tennis players at the 1992 Summer Olympics
Place of birth missing (living people)